Shanghai Red is a 2006 Chinese-American thriller-drama film directed by Oscar L. Costo, starring Vivian Wu and Richard Burgi.

Cast
 Vivian Wu as Zhu Mei Li
 Richard Burgi as Michael Johnson
 Sun Honglei as Lawyer
 Ge You as Mr. Feng
 Kenny Bee as Lian Wei
 Tong Zhengwei as Wei Ma
 Monica Mok as Ma Fang
 Roger Yuan as Mr. Lee

Release
The film premiered at the Montreal World Film Festival on 27 August 2006.

Reception
Ronnie Scheib of Variety praised the performances of Wu and Sun, and wrote that the film "provides its own correctives, taking unexpected detours at all the plot’s weakest, most predictable moments, and thereby defusing action-movie cliches."

Gary Goldstein of the Los Angeles Times wrote that Costo "effectively tells the film’s carefully unfolding story in flashbacks", while Kane's "rich" cinematographer "vividly captures a mostly sleek and seductive Shanghai".

Maggie Lee of The Hollywood Reporter wrote that "any attempt at psychological penetration is distracted by all the action, suspense, romance and Shanghai city tours that fill up the film’s running time."

References

External links
 
 

American thriller drama films
Chinese thriller drama films
2006 thriller drama films